Fracastorius is the lava-flooded remnant of an ancient lunar impact crater located at the southern edge of Mare Nectaris. To the northwest of this formation lies the crater Beaumont, while to the northeast is Rosse.

The northern wall of this crater is missing, with only mounds appearing in the lunar mare to mark the outline. The lava that formed Mare Nectaris also invaded this crater, so the structure now forms a bay-like extension. The remainder of the rim is heavily worn and covered in lesser impact craters, leaving little of the original rim intact. The maximum elevation of the rim is 2.4 km. The most prominent of these craters is Fractastorius D, which overlies a portion of the western rim.

Fracastorius has no central peak, but a long, slender rille runs across the middle of the floor in a generally east–west direction.

The crater commemorates the Italian scholar, astronomer and poet Girolamo Fracastoro, "Fracastorius" (1478‑1553).

Satellite craters

By convention these features are identified on lunar maps by placing the letter on the side of the crater midpoint that is closest to Fracastorius.

References

 
 
 
 
 
 
 
 
 
 
 

Impact craters on the Moon